Leśniczówka may refer to the following places:
Leśniczówka, Chełm County in Lublin Voivodeship (east Poland)
Leśniczówka, Kraśnik County in Lublin Voivodeship (east Poland)
Leśniczówka, Lublin County in Lublin Voivodeship (east Poland)
Leśniczówka, Łódź Voivodeship (central Poland)
Leśniczówka, Lipsko County in Masovian Voivodeship (east-central Poland)
Leśniczówka, Siedlce County in Masovian Voivodeship (east-central Poland)
Leśniczówka, Greater Poland Voivodeship (west-central Poland)
Leśniczówka, Opole Voivodeship (south-west Poland)